Francisc Şimon (8 January 1927 – 12 January 2005) was a Romanian water polo player. He competed at the 1952 Summer Olympics and the 1956 Summer Olympics.

References

External links
 

1927 births
2005 deaths
Romanian male water polo players
Olympic water polo players of Romania
Water polo players at the 1952 Summer Olympics
Water polo players at the 1956 Summer Olympics
Sportspeople from Târgu Mureș